The Pasi (also spelled Passi) is a Dalit (untouchable) community of India. Pasi refers to tapping toddy, a traditional occupation of the Pasi community. The Pasi are divided into Gujjar, Kaithwas, and Boria. They are classified as an Other Backward Class in Andhra Pradesh and Telangana. They live in the northern Indian states of Bihar and Uttar Pradesh.

Etymology
According to William Crooke, the word Pashi derives from the Sanskrit word Pashika, a noose used by Pasi to climb and tap toddy, a drink obtained from palm tree. The tapping of toddy is the original occupation of the Pasi community. However, like other aspirational caste groups of India, Pasis have a myth of origin. They claim to originate from the sweat of Parshuram, an incarnation of Vishnu. They claim support for this in the word sweat being derived from the Hindi word Pasina. It also furthers their claim of "Kshatriyatva".

Population
The Pasi live mainly in the northern Indian states of Bihar and Uttar Pradesh, where their traditional occupation was that of rearing pigs. The Pasis of most of the north Indian states have been classified as Scheduled Castes by the Government of India.
In the 2001 Indian census, the Pasi were recorded as the second-largest Dalit group in Uttar Pradesh. At the time, they constituted 16 per cent of the Dalit population of the state and mostly inhabited the Awadh region. The 2011 Census of India for the state recorded their population as 6,522,166. This figure includes the Tarmali.

History 
Ramnarayan Rawat states that the role of the Pasi (and other untouchable) communities in the Kisan Sabha movement has been understated by earlier historians. He writes that earlier scholarship held  Pasi involvement to be minimal, late-arriving, and more inclined towards criminality and rioting than political activism. He notes that the involvement of Pasi and Chamars was significant from the outset. According to him, the Pasi, being land owners, had the same concerns as other savarna groups, rather than being the 'alienated' pig-rearers as which they had sometimes been characterised. Chandra Bhan Prasad, a political commentator, has said that those who continued pig-rearing were ill-treated by socio-political activists, who blamed the occupation in large part for their untouchable status rather than Brahminism.

The Pasi have in recent times engaged in invention of tradition. Badri Narayan, a social historian and cultural anthropologist, says that Of late, Hindu Nationalists (Rashtriya Swayamsevak Sangh and affiliates) have been trying to appropriate different folk-heroes of the Pasi caste as Hindu icons to mobilize the electoral prospects of the Bharatiya Janata Party. Hindu nationalists have supported claims that there was a Pasi kingdom that ruled what is now Uttar Pradesh and Bihar in the 11th and 12th century. The rulers of this claimed state include Bijli Pasi.

Notable people 

Bijli Pasi, a king from the Pasi community.
Madari Pasi was a leader of the militant peasant Eka Movement.

See also

Saroj (surname)
Dalits in Bihar
Sanskritisation
Turuk Pasi

References

Further reading

Shudra castes
Dalit communities
Hindu ethnic groups
Scheduled Castes of Uttar Pradesh
Scheduled Castes of Bihar
Scheduled Castes of Haryana
Scheduled Castes of Delhi
Scheduled Castes of Madhya Pradesh
Scheduled Castes of Jharkhand
Scheduled Castes of Chhattisgarh
Scheduled Castes of Uttarakhand
Scheduled Castes of West Bengal
Scheduled Castes of Assam